Jesse Gordon Spencer (born 12 February 1979) is an Australian actor and musician. He is best known for his roles as Billy Kennedy on the Australian soap opera Neighbours (1994–2000, 2005, 2022), Robert Chase on the American medical drama House (2004–2012) and Captain Matthew Casey on the American drama Chicago Fire (2012–2021).

Early life
Spencer was born in Melbourne on 12 February 1979 to Rodney Spencer, a radiologist, and Robyn Spencer, who were founders of the Australians Against Further Immigration political party, and would both later contest the 1998 federal election for One Nation.

He is one of four siblings. Spencer has two older brothers: Tarney Spencer, an oculoplastic surgeon, and Luke Spencer, an orthopaedic surgeon. His younger sister, Polly Spencer, is an anaesthetist. Growing up, he attended Canterbury Primary School, Malvern Central School, and the private Scotch College. While there, he auditioned for the long-running soap opera Neighbours. He completed his VCE and had gained a place at Monash University but deferred to pursue acting.

Career

Acting
Spencer starred as Billy Kennedy in the Australian soap opera Neighbours from 1994 to 2000. He later reprised his role in 2005, in an episode celebrating the show's 20th anniversary. His character was the son of long-term iconic Ramsay Street residents Dr. Karl Kennedy and Susan Kennedy.

After his time on Neighbours he co-starred in films such as Winning London with the Olsen Twins, Uptown Girls and Swimming Upstream.

Spencer starred as intensive care specialist and surgeon Dr. Robert Chase on the Fox medical drama House from 2004 to 2012. He played Chase for the show's entire run, becoming the second longest-serving member of the title character's team.

Spencer starred as firefighter Matthew Casey in the NBC drama Chicago Fire from 2012 to 2021.

In 2022 it was confirmed that Spencer would return to Neighbours as part of the series finale.

Music
Spencer began his musical career with the Australian Boys Choir, performing with them from 1986 to 1992. He plays the violin in Band from TV, a group that includes his former House co-star Hugh Laurie. They play at various events, giving the money they earn to charity. The band played on Idol Gives Back in April 2008.

Awards
For Neighbours, Spencer was nominated for "Most Popular Actor" at the 1998 and 1999 Logie Awards. For House, he was nominated for "Choice TV Breakout Performance – Male" at the 2005 Teen Choice Awards and "Outstanding Performance by an Ensemble in a Drama Series" at the 2008 Screen Actors Guild Awards. He received a "Golden Boomerang" at the 2006 Australians in Film Breakthrough Awards for his work on House. In 2007, he was included in People Magazine 100 Most Beautiful People issue.

Personal life
Spencer met his  House co-star, American actress Jennifer Morrison, in March 2004 at Vancouver International Airport when they were on their way to film the pilot episode of House. They began dating in July 2004 and became engaged while vacationing in Paris at the Eiffel Tower during Christmas 2006, but in August 2007, Spencer and Morrison announced they had called off their engagement. Their characters were also involved on the show, marrying and divorcing in the sixth season.

Spencer dated the British actress and singer Louise Griffiths from 2008 to 2010. Spencer dated Brazilian big wave surfer Maya Gabeira from 2010 to 2013. 

He began dating neuroscientist Kali Woodruff Carr in 2014, getting engaged in 2019. The couple married on 27 June 2020.

Spencer became a U.S. citizen in November 2021.

Filmography

Film

Television

Music videos

Stage

Awards and nominations

References

External links

 
 
 

1979 births
Living people
Male actors from Melbourne
Australian male child actors
Australian expatriate male actors in the United States
Australian male film actors
Australian male television actors
Pauline Hanson's One Nation politicians
People educated at Scotch College, Melbourne
20th-century Australian male actors
21st-century Australian male actors
People from the City of Boroondara